Korniaktów Południowy  is a village in the administrative district of Gmina Białobrzegi, within Łańcut County, Podkarpackie Voivodeship, in south-eastern Poland.

The village has an approximate population of 500.

References

Villages in Łańcut County